The Hobbema Hawks were a junior "A" ice hockey team in the Alberta Junior Hockey League (AJHL) based in Hobbema, Alberta, Canada.

History 
The Hobbema Hawks' inaugural season was 1981–82, entering the AJHL at the same time as the Fort McMurray Oil Barons. The team ceased operations in 1993 after taking a leave of absence prior to the 1990–91 season.

Season-by-season record 

Note: GP = games played, W = wins, L = losses, T = Ties, OTL = overtime losses, Pts = points, Pct = Winning Percentage, GF = goals for, GA = goals against, PIM = penalties in minutes

See also 
 List of ice hockey teams in Alberta

References

External links 
Alberta Junior Hockey League

Defunct Alberta Junior Hockey League teams
Defunct ice hockey teams in Alberta
Defunct junior ice hockey teams in Canada
Ice hockey clubs established in 1981
1981 establishments in Alberta